Brickellin is an O-methylated flavonol. It can be found in Brickellia veronicifolia.

References 

O-methylated flavonols
Flavonoids found in Asteraceae